In mathematics, quantales are certain partially ordered algebraic structures that generalize locales (point free topologies) as well as various multiplicative lattices of ideals from ring theory and functional analysis (C*-algebras, von Neumann algebras). Quantales are sometimes referred to as complete residuated semigroups.

Overview
A quantale is a complete lattice Q with an associative binary operation ∗ : Q × Q → Q, called its multiplication, satisfying a distributive property such that

and

for all x, yi in Q, i in I (here I is any index set). The quantale is unital if it has an identity element e for its multiplication:

for all x in Q. In this case, the quantale is naturally a monoid with respect to its multiplication ∗.

A unital quantale may be defined equivalently as a monoid in the category Sup of complete join semi-lattices.

A unital quantale is an idempotent semiring under join and multiplication.

A unital quantale in which the identity is the top element of the underlying lattice is said to be strictly two-sided (or simply integral).

A commutative quantale is a quantale whose multiplication is commutative. A frame, with its multiplication given by the meet operation, is a typical example of a strictly two-sided commutative quantale. Another simple example is provided by the unit interval together with its usual multiplication.

An idempotent quantale is a quantale whose multiplication is idempotent. A frame is the same as an idempotent strictly two-sided quantale.

An involutive quantale is a quantale with an involution

that preserves joins:

A quantale homomorphism is a map f : Q1 → Q2 that preserves joins and multiplication for all x, y, xi in Q1, and i in I:

See also 
 Relation algebra

References
 
 J. Paseka, J. Rosicky, Quantales, in: B. Coecke, D. Moore, A. Wilce, (Eds.), Current Research in Operational Quantum Logic: Algebras, Categories and Languages, Fund. Theories Phys., vol. 111, Kluwer Academic Publishers, 2000, pp. 245–262. 
 M. Piazza, M. Castellan, Quantales and structural rules. Journal of Logic and Computation, 6 (1996), 709–724.
 K. Rosenthal, Quantales and Their Applications, Pitman Research Notes in Mathematics Series 234, Longman Scientific & Technical, 1990.

Order theory